Glenn Hawker (born 17 March 1961) is a former Australian rules footballer. A classy right footer for the Essendon Football Club during the late 1970s and 1980s, Hawker played 200 games for the Bombers, including their 1984 and 1985 premiership sides, before finishing his career with rival team Carlton. He was originally from Kaniva, Victoria.

References

External links

Profile at Essendonfc.com.au

Essendon Football Club players
Essendon Football Club Premiership players
Carlton Football Club players
Crichton Medal winners
Australian rules footballers from Victoria (Australia)
Living people
1961 births
Victorian State of Origin players
Two-time VFL/AFL Premiership players